WQKY (98.9 FM, "The River 98.9") is a commercial FM radio station licensed to serve Emporium, Pennsylvania. The station is owned by Salter Communications, Inc. and broadcasts a classic hits format.

History
The Federal Communications Commission granted Emporium Broadcasting Company a construction permit for the station on April 27, 1983 with the WQKY call sign. Originally assigned to 92.7 MHz, the FCC granted the station its first license on August 6, 1985.

The FCC granted a transfer of the station's license to Priority Communications, Inc. on December 20, 1993. On July 13, 1994, the FCC granted the station a construction permit to change the station's frequency to 98.9 MHz (Channel 255A) followed by a new license granted on September 11, 1996.

The FCC granted a transfer of the station's license to Salter Communications, Inc. on November 9, 2006. The sale consummated on November 22, 2006.

References

External links

QKY